Maria Elisa Guimarães Zanini (born September 23, 1958 in Rio de Janeiro) is a former international freestyle swimmer from Brazil, who participated in a Summer Olympics for her native country.

At 15 years old, she participated at the inaugural World Aquatics Championships in 1973 Belgrade, where she finished 10th in the 400-metre freestyle, 12th in the 800-metre freestyle, and 15th in the 200-metre freestyle.

She was at the 1975 World Aquatics Championships in Cali. In the 800-metre freestyle, she finished 17th, with a time of 9:34.48, far from her personal best at this moment, the South American record (9:15.77). In the 400-metre freestyle, she finished 17th, with a time of 4:34.89, far from her South American record (4:29.32).

She was at the 1975 Pan American Games, in Mexico City, where she won the bronze medal in the 4×100-metre freestyle. She also finished 5th in the 200-metre freestyle, 5th in the 400-metre freestyle, and 6th in the 800-metre freestyle.

At the 1976 Summer Olympics, in Montreal, she swam the 400-metre and 800-metre freestyle, not reaching the finals.

Participated at the 1978 World Aquatics Championships in West Berlin, where she finished 19th in the 200-metre freestyle, and 34th in the 100-metre freestyle.

She was at the 1979 Pan American Games, in San Juan, where she finished 5th in the 4×100-metre freestyle, 5th in the 4×100-metre medley, 6th in the 200-metre freestyle, and 14th in the 100-metre freestyle.

She broke the South American record of all freestyle races (100,200,400,800 and 1500-metre freestyle). She was the first woman from South America to break the one-minute barrier in the 100-metre freestyle.

References

1958 births
Living people
Brazilian female freestyle swimmers
Swimmers at the 1975 Pan American Games
Swimmers at the 1976 Summer Olympics
Swimmers at the 1979 Pan American Games
Olympic swimmers of Brazil
Swimmers from Rio de Janeiro (city)
Pan American Games bronze medalists for Brazil
Pan American Games medalists in swimming
Medalists at the 1975 Pan American Games
20th-century Brazilian women
21st-century Brazilian women